South Upi, officially the Municipality of South Upi (Maguindanaon: Pagabagatan Upi; Iranun: Inged a South Upi), is a 4th class municipality in the province of Maguindanao del Sur, Philippines. According to the 2020 census, it has a population of 43,197 people.

South Upi was created through Presidential Decree No. 1580 by then President Ferdinand Marcos on June 11, 1978. It was carved from the municipality of Upi.

It also known as Timanan.

Geography

Barangays

South Upi is politically subdivided into 11 barangays.
 Kuya
 Biarong
 Bongo
 Itaw
 Kigan
 Lamud
 Looy/Santa Fe
 Pandan
 Pilar
 Romangaob (Poblacion)
 San Jose

Climate

Demographics

Economy

References

External links
 South Upi Profile at the DTI Cities and Municipalities Competitive Index
 [ Philippine Standard Geographic Code]
Philippine Census Information
Local Governance Performance Management System

Municipalities of Maguindanao del Sur
Establishments by Philippine presidential decree